Prionopterina is a genus of moths of the family Erebidae. The genus was erected by George Hampson in 1926.

Species
 Prionopterina grammatistis (Meyrick, 1897)
 Prionopterina modesta Turner, 1936
 Prionopterina tritosticha (Turner, 1902)

References

Calpinae
Moth genera